Hypertension is a monthly peer-reviewed scientific journal that was established in 1979. It is published on behalf of the American Heart Association by Lippincott Williams & Wilkins. The editor-in-chief is Rhian M. Touyz. The journal publishes original manuscripts, invited review summaries, invited case-based reviews, recent study highlights, invited brief commentaries, scientific or technical tutorials, letters to the editor, and novel findings of unusual interest. It covers all aspects of research on hypertension, including pathophysiology, blood pressure regulation, clinical treatment, and prevention.

Abstracting and indexing
The journal is abstracted and indexed in:

According to the Journal Citation Reports, the journal has a 2020 impact factor of 10.190.

References

External links

Publications established in 1979
Hypertension journals
Monthly journals
American Heart Association academic journals
English-language journals